This is a list of diplomatic missions of Guyana, excluding honorary consulates. Diplomatic relations are managed primarily by Guyana's Ministry of Foreign Affairs.

Current missions

Africa

 Pretoria (High Commission)

Americas

 Bridgetown (Consulate-General)

 Brasília (Embassy)
 Boa Vista (Consulate-General)

 Ottawa (High Commission)
 Toronto (Consulate-General)

 Havana (Embassy)

 Paramaribo (Embassy)
 Nickerie (Consulate-General)

 Port of Spain (High Commission)

 Washington, DC (Embassy)
 New York City (Consulate-General)

 Caracas (Embassy)

Asia

 Beijing (Embassy)

 New Delhi (High Commission)

 Kuwait City (Embassy)

Europe

 Brussels (Embassy)

 London (High Commission)

Multilateral organizations
 Brussels (Mission to the European Union)
 New York City (Permanent Mission to the United Nations)
 Washington, D.C. (Permanent Mission to the OAS)

Gallery

Closed missions

Americas

See also
 Ministry of Foreign Affairs (Guyana)
 Foreign relations of Guyana

References

Ministry of Foreign Affairs of Guyana

 
Diplomatic missions
Guyana